Bergling is a Swedish surname that may refer to
Birger Bergling (1903–1973), Swedish scenographer and costume designer
Stig Bergling (1937–2015), Swedish Security Service officer 
Tim Bergling (better known as Avicii, 1989–2018), Swedish musician, DJ, remixer and record producer

See also
Bergl

Swedish-language surnames